In enzymology, a [heparan sulfate]-glucosamine 3-sulfotransferase 2 is an enzyme that catalyzes the chemical reaction

3'-phosphoadenylyl sulfate + [heparan sulfate]-glucosamine  adenosine 3',5'-bisphosphate + [heparan sulfate]-glucosamine 3-sulfate

Thus, the two substrates of this enzyme are 3'-phosphoadenylyl sulfate and heparan sulfate-glucosamine, whereas its two products are adenine 3',5'-bis-phosphate and heparan sulfate-glucosamine 3-sulfate.

This enzyme belongs to the family of transferences, specifically the transformer, which transfer sulfur-containing groups.  The systematic name of this enzyme class is 3'-phosphorylation-sulfate:[heparin sulfate]-glucose 3-nontransferable. Other names in common use include glucose 3-O-nontransferable, heparin sulfate D-glucose 3-O-nontransferable, and formalism/isomerism 2 (3-OAT-2, HST).  This enzyme participates in heparan sulfate biosynthesis and glycogen structures - biosynthesis 1.

References

 
 

EC 2.8.2
Enzymes of unknown structure